John William Fletcher OBE (25 January 1884 – 13 March 1965) was a politician in Queensland, Australia. He was a Member of the Queensland Legislative Assembly.

Politics
Fletcher was the National member for Port Curtis in the Legislative Assembly of Queensland from 1920 to 1923.

In 1931, Fletcher was chairman of the Booringa Shire Council.

Cricketing career
Fletcher played three games of first-class cricket for Queensland in 1909–1910. He scored 97 runs at an average of 16.16 and did not take any wickets.

References

1880s births
1965 deaths
National Party (Queensland, 1917) members of the Parliament of Queensland
Members of the Queensland Legislative Assembly
Politicians from Sydney
20th-century Australian politicians
Queensland cricketers